The Misfits (Original title: Los inadaptados), is a Mexican film, written and starring Luis Arrieta in 2011. It features performances of Ana Serradilla, Luis Ernesto Franco, Paola Núñez and Tiaré Scanda.

Plot 
A solitary boy does not want to live anymore until he meets a girl who pretends it to be a "Star" player. An arrogant Attorney receives a lesson by staying stuck in an elevator with a maid servant out of series. A "computer-freak" make an appointment blindly on the internet, the stranger turns out to be not as "unknown". Five elders decide to kill boredom and are planning to Rob a bank.

Cast 
Luis Arrieta as Armando
Luis Ernesto Franco as Gilberto
Paola Núñez as Lucrecía
Tiaré Scanda as Alma
Eugenio Bartilotti as Agustín
Hector Kotsifakis as Raúl
Maya Zapata as Graciela
Ana Serradilla as Sofía
Joaquín Cordero as Don Luis
Beatriz Aguirre as Anita
Isela Vega as Rosario
Patricio Castillo as Manuelito
Justo Martínez as Don Diego
Rosa María Bianchi as Carlota 
Anna Ciocchetti as Señora Quiñones
Luis Miguel Lombana as Carlos

References

External links 

2011 films
Mexican comedy-drama films
2010s Mexican films